Magomet Izmaylovich Isayev (1928 – June 20, 2011) was a Russian Esperantist, translator, and linguist. He is most notable for his work on Iranian languages (primarily Ossetic) and Esperanto.

References

1928 births
2011 deaths
Russian Esperantists
Linguists from Russia
20th-century translators